The following radio stations broadcast on FM frequency 104.5 MHz:

Antarctica
Ice FM at McMurdo, Ross Dependency

Argentina
 LRM869 in Recreo, Santa Fe
 LRA305 in Rosario, Santa Fe
 Radio María in Isidro Casanova, Buenos Aires

Australia
 Star 104.5 in Gosford
 2PNN in Broken Hill
 Triple U FM in Nowra
 Triple M Brisbane
 Dusty Radio in Coober Pedy
 Eden FM Radio in Eden
 ABC Radio National in Alexandra
 SBS Radio in Launceston

Belize
Faith FM

Canada (Channel 283)

 CBQN-FM in Osnaburgh, Ontario
 CBU-FM-8 in Whitehorse, Yukon
 CBYT-FM in Campbell River, British Columbia
 CFGT-FM in Alma, Quebec
 CFLG-FM in Cornwall, Ontario
 CHOU-FM-1 in Montreal, Quebec
 CFNT-FM in Tobique Indian Reserve, New Brunswick
 CFQK-FM in Kaministiquia, Ontario
 CHCR-FM-1 in Wilno, Ontario
 CHUM-FM in Toronto, Ontario
 CIAG-FM in Argentia, Newfoundland and Labrador
 CISP-FM in Pemberton, British Columbia
 CJCQ-FM-1 in Meadow Lake, Saskatchewan
 CJRI-FM in Fredericton, New Brunswick
 CJSB-FM in Swan River, Manitoba
 CJTS-FM in Sherbrooke, Quebec
 CJTT-FM in New Liskeard, Ontario
 CKAU-FM in Maliotenam, Quebec
 CKBZ-FM-1 in Pritchard, British Columbia
 CKJX-FM in Olds, Alberta
 CKQV-FM-2 in Kenora, Ontario
 CKQV-FM-3 in Sioux Lookout, Ontario
 CKMR-FM in Strathmore, Alberta
 CKTL-FM in Ste-Rose, Quebec
 CKUD-FM in Maple Creek, Saskatchewan
 VF2194 in Riley Creek, British Columbia
 VF2544 in Port Alberni, British Columbia
 VF7151 in Pierrefonds, Quebec

China 
 CNR China Rural Radio in Hohhot (in all times except 05:00-14:00)
 CNR Ethnic Minority Radio in Hohhot (during 05:00-14:00, using Mongolian)

Greece
104.5 Crete Island, Greece in Crete

Jamaica
BBC World Service

Malaysia
 Era in Johor Bahru, Johor and Singapore
 Hot FM in Ipoh, Kuala Kangsar, Central Perak, South Perak, Hilir Perak and North Selangor
 TraXX FM in Miri, Sarawak

Mexico
 XHARO-FM in Ciudad Nezahualcóyotl, Estado de México
 XHCHA-FM in Chihuahua, Chihuahua
 XHCPBQ-FM in Bacerac, Sonora

 XHCU-FM in Cuautla, Morelos
 XHDC-FM in Aguascalientes, Aguascalientes
 XHDRD-FM in Durango, Durango
 XHEVC-FM in Fortín, Veracruz
 XHGMS-FM in Martínez de la Torre, Veracruz
 XHKE-FM in Navojoa, Sonora
 XHLTN-FM in Tijuana, Baja California
 XHMF-FM in Monterrey, Nuevo León
 XHMXS-FM in Sicuicho, Los Reyes, Michoacán
 XHNKA-FM in Felipe Carrillo Puerto, Quintana Roo

 XHRD-FM in Pachuca, Hidalgo
 XHTTT-FM in Colima, Colima
 XHVAL-FM in Valle de Bravo, Estado de México
 XHZN-FM in Celaya, Guanajuato

Nigeria
 OSBC in Osogbo
 Atlantic in Uyo
 Empire in Akure

South Africa
 UCT Radio in Cape Town

United Kingdom
BBC Radio Lancashire in Lancashire, England

United States (Channel 283)

  in Gibsland, Louisiana
 KBMC-LP in Macks Creek, Missouri
  in Lenwood, California
 KBUN-FM in Blackduck, Minnesota
 KBYC in Markham, Texas
 KCBW in Grandin, Missouri
 KCCR-FM in Blunt, South Dakota
  in Wellton, Arizona
  in Cozad, Nebraska
  in Cedar Rapids, Iowa
 KDOT in Reno, Nevada
 KENJ-LP in Lowell, Arkansas
 KFXJ in Augusta, Kansas
 KGDH-LP in Mobile, Alabama
 KHDZ-LP in Porterville, California
 KHHS in Pearcy, Arkansas
 KHPD-LP in Hurricane, Utah
  in Blue Earth, Minnesota
 KJTX in Jefferson, Texas
 KJYR in Newport, Washington
  in Dallas, Texas
  in Bloomfield, New Mexico
 KKMY in Orange, Texas
  in Stevensville, Montana
 KLSW in Covington, Washington
 KMGC in Camden, Arkansas
  in Mercer Island, Washington
  in Pryor, Oklahoma
 KNBR-FM in San Francisco, California
 KNGS-LP in Hanford, California
 KPLP in White Salmon, Washington
 KPTJ In Grape Creek, Texas
  in Gregory, Texas
 KRVQ-FM in Lake Isabella, California
  in Washington, Missouri
  in Omaha, Nebraska
 KSTT-FM in Atascadero, California
  in Canon City, Colorado
 KTRN in White Hall, Arkansas
 KTZB-LP in Pasco, Washington
 KUMR in Doolittle, Missouri
 KVIW-LP in Deming, New Mexico
 KWMZ-FM in Empire, Louisiana
 KWPV in Wynnewood, Oklahoma
 KYAP in Centennial, Wyoming
 KYTP-LP in Galt, California
 KZCW-LP in Conroe, Texas
  in San Antonio, Texas
 KZJJ in Mesa, Washington
  in Lake Havasu City, Arizona
  in Reserve, New Mexico
 KZZW in Mooreland, Oklahoma
 WASP-LP in Huntington, West Virginia
 WAXX in Eau Claire, Wisconsin
  in Carrier Mills, Illinois
  in Hope Mills, North Carolina
 WCCX in Waukesha, Wisconsin
 WFLM in White City, Florida
 WFMB-FM in Springfield, Illinois
  in Gallatin, Tennessee
  in Falmouth, Virginia
 WHAJ in Bluefield, West Virginia
 WHLC in Highlands, North Carolina
 WHNB in Hancock, New York
 WIFL-LP in Weirsdale, Florida
 WILZ in Saginaw, Michigan
  in Noblesville, Indiana
  in Albany, Georgia
 WKHJ in Mountain Lake Park, Maryland
  in Knoxville, Tennessee
 WKPJ-LP in Athens, Tennessee
  in Lexington-Fayette, Kentucky
 WLXD in State College, Mississippi
  in Montpelier, Ohio
 WNBT-FM in Wellsboro, Pennsylvania
  in Norfolk, Virginia
 WNXX in Jackson, Louisiana
 WOKV-FM in Atlantic Beach, Florida
 WQKT in Wooster, Ohio
  in Philadelphia, Pennsylvania
 WRFQ (FM) in Mount Pleasant, South Carolina
 WRFU-LP in Urbana, Illinois
 WRVR in Memphis, Tennessee
  in Whitewater, Wisconsin
  in Muskegon, Michigan
  in Aurora, North Carolina
  in Mechanicville, New York
  in Conway, New Hampshire
 WWDN in Danville, Virginia
 WWOH-LP in Marietta, Ohio
  in Plymouth, Wisconsin
 WXLO in Fitchburg, Massachusetts
  in Cambridge Springs, Pennsylvania
  in Hattiesburg, Mississippi
 WXYR-LP in Monticello, Kentucky
 WYCJ-LP in Simpsonville, South Carolina
 WYHW in Wilmington, North Carolina
 WYWH-LP in Athens, Ohio
  in Dalton, Georgia
 WZFR in Eastpoint, Florida
 WZTC in Traverse City, Michigan

References

Lists of radio stations by frequency